EleutherAI is a grass-roots non-profit artificial intelligence (AI) research group. The group, considered an open source version of OpenAI, was formed in a Discord server in July 2020 to organize a replication of GPT-3. Despite a lack of formal funding or organizational structure, it rapidly became a leading player in large scale natural language processing research, releasing the largest open-source GPT-3-like model in the world March 21, 2021, setting new open-source state-of-the-art records in June 2021 and Feburary 2022. In January 2023, EleutherAI formally incorporated as a non-profit research institute.

History 
EleutherAI began as a Discord server on July 7, 2020 under the tentative name “LibreAI” before rebranding to “EleutherAI” later that month. 

On December 30, 2020, EleutherAI released the Pile, a curated dataset of diverse text for training large language models.. While the paper referenced the existence of the GPT-Neo models, the models themselves were not released until March 21, 2021. According to a retrospective written several months later, the authors did not anticipate that "people would care so much about our "small models."" . On June 9, 2021, EleutherAI followed this up with GPT-J-6B, a six billion parameter language model that was again the largest open source GPT-3-like model in the world. 

Following the release of DALL-E by OpenAI in January 2021, EleutherAI started working on  text-to-image synthesis models. When OpenAI didn't release DALL-E publicly, EleutherAI's Katherine Crowson and digital artist Ryan Murdock developed a technique for using CLIP (another model developed by OpenAI) to convert regular image generation models into text-to-image synthesis ones. Building on ideas dating back to Google's DeepDream, they found their first major success combining CLIP with another publicly available model called VQGAN. Crowson released the technology by tweeting  notebooks demonstrating the technique that people could run for free without any special equipment. This work is credited by Stability AI CEO Emad Mostaque as motivating the founding of Stability AI.

While EleutherAI initially turned down funding offers, preferring to use Google's TPU Research Cloud Program to source their compute, by early 2021 they had accepted funding from CoreWeave (a small cloud computing company) and SpellML (a cloud infrastructure company) in the form of access to powerful GPU clusters that are necessary for large scale machine learning research. On Feb 10, 2022 they released GPT-NeoX-20B, a model similar to their prior work but scaled up thanks to the resources CoreWeave provided. This model was their third to have the title “largest open source GPT-3-style language model in the world,” and first to be the largest open source language model (of any type), surpassing a model trained by  Meta AI that held the title for two months. As of March 6, 2023, it is the second largest open source language model in the world.

Research 
According to their website, EleutherAI is a "decentralized grassroots collective of volunteer researchers, engineers, and developers focused on AI alignment, scaling, and open source AI research". While they do not sell any of their technologies as products, they publish the results of their research in academic venues, write blog posts detailing their ideas and methodologies, and provide trained models for anyone to use for free.
EleutherAI is a "decentralized grassroots collective of volunteer researchers, engineers, and developers focusing on AI alignment, scaling, and open source AI research," according to its website. Although they don't market any of their technologies as products, they do publish the findings of their research in academic journals, discuss their concepts and methods in blog postings, and offer trained models for use by anybody at no cost.

The Pile 
The Pile is a 800 GiB dataset designed for training large language models. It was originally developed to train EleutherAI's GPT-Neo models, but has become widely used to train models including by researchers at Microsoft,  Meta AI, Stanford University, and the Beijing Academy of Artificial Intelligence. Compared to other datasets the Pile's main distinguishing features are that it is a curated selection of data chosen by researchers at EleutherAI to contain information they thought language models should learn, and it is the only such dataset that is thoroughly documented by the researchers who developed it.

GPT-3 Replications 
EleutherAI's most prominent research relates to its work to train open source large language models inspired by OpenAI's GPT-3. EleutherAI's "GPT-Neo" model series has released 125 million, 1.3 billion, 2.7 billion, 6 billion, and 20 billion parameter models. 

 GPT-Neo (125M, 1.3B, 2.7B): released in March 2021, it was the largest open source GPT-3-style language model in the world at the time of release.

 GPT-J (6B): released in March 2021, it was the largest open source GPT-3-style language model in the world at the time of release.

 GPT-NeoX (20B): released in February 2022, it was the largest open source language model in the world at the time of release.

While the overwhelming majority of large language models are trained in either English or Chinese, EleutherAI also trains language models in other languages such as Polyglot-Ko, trained in collaboration with the Korean NLP company TUNiB.

Public Reception

Praise 
EleutherAI's work to democratize GPT-3 has won substantial praise from a variety of open source advocates. They won the UNESCO Netexplo Global Innovation Award in 2021, InfoWorld's Best of Open Source Software Award in 2021 and 2022, was nominated for VentureBeat's AI Innovation Award in 2021.

Gary Marcus, a cognitive scientist and noted critic of deep learning companies such as OpenAI and DeepMind, has repeatedly praised EleutherAI's dedication to open source and transparent research.

Maximilian Gahntz, a senior policy researcher at the Mozilla Foundation, applauded EleutherAI’s efforts to give more researchers the ability to audit and assess AI technology. “If models are open and if data sets are open, that’ll enable much more of the critical research that’s pointed out many of the flaws and harms associated with generative AI and that’s often far too difficult to conduct.”

Criticism 
Technology journalist Kyle Wiggers has raised concerns about whether EleutherAI is as independent as it claims, or "whether the involvement of commercially motivated ventures like Stability AI and Hugging Face — both of which are backed by substantial venture capital — might influence EleutherAI’s research."

References 

Language modeling
Artificial intelligence laboratories
Deep learning
Applied machine learning